Up Nately LNR is a   local nature reserve in Up Nately in Hampshire. It is owned by Hampshire County Council and Surrey County Council and managed by the  Basingstoke Canal Authority. It is part of Butter Wood, which is a Site of Special Scientific Interest.

This is a section of the Basingstoke Canal between Up Nately and the Greywell Tunnel. There is water in the canal and the towpath is a public footpath.

References

Local Nature Reserves in Hampshire